The Choptank Formation is a geologic formation in Virginia and Maryland. It preserves fossils dating from the Miocene epoch of the Neogene period.

Fossils
The Choptank Formation is extremely fossiliferous. Some of the fossil species represented include the following:

Sharks
Otodus megalodon
Carcharodon hastalis
Isurus oxyrhincus
Carcharomodus escheri
Physogaleus contortus
Galeocerdo aduncus
Carcharhinus
Hemipristis serra
Squatina sp.
Notorhyncus cepedianus
Carcharias
Isurus retroflexus
Parotodus benedeni
Alopias vulpinus
Alopias grandis
Cetorhinus
Negaprion brevirostris
Rhizoprionodon
Sphryna laevissima

Rays and Other Cartilaginous Fish
Aetobatus arcuatus
Pteromyaleus sp.
Dasyatis rugosa
Dasyatis probsti
Pinthicus stenodon

Fish
Acipenseridae indet.
Opsanus sp.
Serranidae sp.
Pogonias sp.
Sciaenops sp.
Tautoga sp.
Acanthocybium cf. solandri
Thunnus sp.
Istiophorus cf. platypterus
Mola cf. pileata
Ariopsis aff. A. felis
Trisopterus sculptus
Micromesistius cognatus
Prionotus

Cetaceans
Aglaocetus sp.
Cetotheriumsp.
Delphinodon sp.
Eurhinodelphis sp.
Macrokentriodon morani
Mesocetus
Parietobalaena
Orycterocetus
Pelocetus

Pinnipeds
Callophoca obscura
Leptophoca proxima
Prophoca sp.

Crocodilians
Thecachampsa antiquus
Thecachampsa sericodon

Invertebrates
Chesapecten nefrens
Chesacardium
Euspira heros
Mariacolpus octonnaria
Macrocallista marylandica
Stewartia anodonta
Marvacrassitella marylandica
Ecphora
Panopea
Albertella aberti

Terrestrial Mammals
Cynarctus wangi
Gomphotherium calvertensis
Hipparion cf. phosphorum

See also

 List of fossiliferous stratigraphic units in Virginia
 Paleontology in Virginia
 Paleontology in Maryland
 Calvert Cliffs State Park
 List of fossiliferous stratigraphic units in Maryland
 Chesapeake Group

References

 

Neogene Maryland
Neogene geology of Virginia